Copelatus monticola is a species of diving beetle. It is part of the genus Copelatus, which is in the subfamily Copelatinae of the family Dytiscidae. It was described by Félix Guignot in 1951.

References

monticola
Beetles described in 1951